Henry Wilmot Ormsby PC, QC (1812 – 1887) was an Irish lawyer and judge.

Ormsby was born at Powerscourt, County Wicklow, the fourth son of the Reverend Henry Ormsby and his wife Margaret Sandys, daughter of the Reverend Michael Sandys. He was educated at the University of Dublin, called to the Bar in 1835 and appointed a Queen's Counsel in 1858. He was Solicitor-General for Ireland in 1868 and again in 1874 and Attorney-General for Ireland in  1875. Later that year he was appointed judge of the Landed Estates Court; he became a judge of the Chancery Division of the High Court of Justice in Ireland in 1878, retiring in 1885.

Ormsby married his first cousin Julia Hamilton, daughter of Henry Hamilton of Tullylish House, County Down and Sarah Sandys (a sister of Ormsby's mother), in 1840. They had five children who reached adulthood, of whom the eldest son Montague predeceased his father.  Their second son George Albert Ormsby was Bishop of British Honduras 1893-1908, and their third son Edwin was Rector of Hartlepool, County Durham  for many years.

References 

Irish barristers
Attorneys-General for Ireland
Solicitors-General for Ireland
1887 deaths
1812 births
People from County Wicklow
19th-century Irish people
Members of the Privy Council of Ireland
Judges of the High Court of Justice in Ireland